Forever is the third studio album by the reggaeton duo R.K.M & Ken-Y. It was released on February 14, 2011, and entered the Billboard Top Latin Albums chart at number 10.

Two singles were released from the album. "Mi Corazón Está Muerto" peaked at number 18 on the Billboard Top Latin Songs chart, and at number 23 on the Billboard Top Latin Pop Songs chart. "Mas" peaked at number 36 on the Billboard Latin Pop Songs hcart

Track listing
"Forever" - 4:39
"Quédate Junto A Mi" - 4:47
"De Rodillas" (Ken-Y) - 3:01
"Mi Corazón Está Muerto" - 3:59
"Más" - 3:33
"A Ella Le Gusta El Dembow" (featuring Zion & Lennox) - 3:45
"Te Amo" - 3:25
"No Vuelvas" - 3:50
"Prefiero Morir" (Ken-Y) - 4:36
"El Party Sigue" (24/7) (featuring Alexis & Fido) - 4:12
"Goodbye" - 3:44
"Yo Sé" (Ken-Y featuring Arthur Hanlon) - 3:36
"Te Doy Una Rosa" - 3:24
"Regalo De Quinceañera" (Ken-Y) - 4:17
"Prefiero Morir (Remix)" - 3:53
"No Vuelvas (Remix)" featuring Zion & Lennox - 4:32

References

External links
 http://www.rakimandkeny.com/

2011 albums
R.K.M & Ken-Y albums